Wright (postcode: 2611) is a suburb currently under development in the Molonglo Valley district of Canberra, located within the Australian Capital Territory, Australia. It is named in honour of Judith Wright, a poet, environmentalist and Aboriginal land rights advocate.

Location and urban structure

Construction of the first house in Wright was completed in June 2012.

Demographics

In this division, there was a population of 17, with 10 males and seven females. The ABS recorded nine dwellings, with a median weekly household income of 2,250. Peculiarly, an unusually high number of motor vehicles per dwelling was recorded, at 12.7.

At the date of the 2016 census, the population of Wright had grown to 2,753, there were 1,262 private dwellings, the median weekly household income was A$2,323, and the number of vehicles per dwelling was 1.8.

Geology

Wright is built on rhyodacite rocks from the Silurian period which are about 414 million years old.  These rocks are part of the Deakin Volcanics.

See also

 Bushfire memorial

References

External links

Molonglo Valley web site

Suburbs of Canberra
2010 establishments in Australia